NGC 164 is a spiral galaxy located in the constellation Pisces. It was found by the German astronomer Albert Marth on 3 August 1864.

References

External links
 

 SEDS

0164
02181
Pisces (constellation)
Spiral galaxies